TJ Sakaluk (born April 27, 1983) is a Canadian professional ice hockey player currently under contract with EHC Dortmund in the German Oberliga.

Early career 
Born in Hamilton, Ontario, Sakaluk played one season in the Ontario Provincial Junior 'A' Hockey League (OPJHL) split between the Oakville Blades and Bramalea Blues followed by 2 seasons with the Port Colborne Sailors of the Golden Horseshoe Junior 'B' League. Following junior, he went on to play 2 seasons at NCAA Division III SUNY-Potsdam.

Professional career 
Has been playing professionally since the 2006-07 season playing in the UHL, ECHL, CHL, Norway and the Netherlands.

External links
 Hockey DB Profile
 TJ Sakaluk's career stats at Eliteprospects.com

1983 births
Living people
Canadian ice hockey defencemen
Ice hockey people from Ontario
Sportspeople from Hamilton, Ontario